is a Japanese voice actress from Tokyo, Japan. She works for 81 Produce. She is also a lecturer for the Yoyogi Animation Institute where she holds classes for voice talents.

Filmography
 Kikis Delivery Service – Ketto's grandmother
 L/R: Licensed by Royalty – Mustard's wife
 My Neighbors the Yamadas – Yasushi
 Noir – Mary

Dubbing
 Cold Case – Ellen Rush (Meredith Baxter)
 Miracles – Madam Kao/Lady Rose (Gua Ah-leh)

Notes

External links
 

1941 births
Living people
Japanese voice actresses
81 Produce voice actors